Antanas Leonovich Bagdonavičius (born 15 June 1938) is a retired Lithuanian rower. He competed for the Soviet Union at the 1960, 1964 and 1968 Summer Olympics, winning a silver medal in the coxed pairs in 1960 (with Zigmas Jukna) finishing in fifth and third place in the eights in 1964 and 1968, respectively. Between 1961 and 1967 he won three gold and four silver medals at European and world championships.

In 1963 Bagdonavičius graduated from the Physics Department of the Vilnius State University. He retired from competitions around the late 1960s, and since 1970 worked as a rowing coach, referee and functionary in Vilnius. He was noted for his calm behavior in any stressing situation.

Publications
 A. Bagdonavičius (1974) Žvilgsnis nuo kranto (in Lithuanian). Gera.
 A. Bagdonavičius (1983) Взгляд с берега (in Russian). Fizkultura i Sport, Moscow.
 A. Bagdonavičius (2008) Charta Solemnis. Pro Meritis Olimpicis (in Lithuanian).
 A. Bagdonavičius (2013) Olimpiniai žiedai (in Lithuanian).

References

External links
 
 

1938 births
Living people
People from Utena District Municipality
Lithuanian male rowers
Lithuanian Sportsperson of the Year winners
Medalists at the 1960 Summer Olympics
Medalists at the 1968 Summer Olympics
Olympic bronze medalists for the Soviet Union
Olympic medalists in rowing
Olympic rowers of the Soviet Union
Olympic silver medalists for the Soviet Union
Rowers at the 1960 Summer Olympics
Rowers at the 1964 Summer Olympics
Rowers at the 1968 Summer Olympics
Soviet male rowers
World Rowing Championships medalists for the Soviet Union
Honoured Masters of Sport of the USSR
European Rowing Championships medalists